Dr Nandini Mundkur is one of India’s developmental paediatricians who has done pioneering work in the field of early detection and intervention services for developmental disorders.

Life and career
Born in a traditional Tamilian household in Tiruvallur, Tamil Nadu in 1949. She completed her MBBS from Maulana Azad Medical College, New Delhi in 1972 and went on to complete her MD (Doctor of Medicine) in Paediatrics in 1977 from the same college.  She practiced as a paediatrician during her early career while pursuing a keen interest in the field of developmental studies.  She underwent a course in Vojta’s Early Diagnosis and Therapy   in Oct 1989.  She is also a Fellow of American Academy of Cerebral Palsy and Developmental Medicine (FAACP and DM).

She currently practices in Bangalore at Jayanagar and Malleshwaram.

Contributions
She spearheaded the awareness-building and creation of early intervention tools in the field of developmental paediatrics in India.  She founded the Centre for Child Development and Disabilities  in the year 2006.  The centre has been treating children with a wide range of developmental problems in areas of physical, mental, language, and learning abilities, from birth to adolescence.  The centre also runs a school that practices early intervention services for children.

Dr Nandini Mundkur is the director of International Children’s Peace Council (ICPC)   and her current work in ICPC involves working in Social Emotional Learning programs for children across the country.

As a director at the Sackhumvit Trust, she has undertaken a program "Learn Math with Fun" via satellite  for children across rural Karnataka (India).

Dr. Nandini Mundkur co-founded Totsguide a comprehensive online self educated portal aimed to cater to the vision of helping every child with disabilities to attain a better future.

Awards and recognition
Sathya Gupta Award for Social Pediatrics – 1978 
Ashoka Fellowship for Social Entrepreneurship – 1986
Desha Snehi award for Dedicated Service towards the Welfare of Children –1996 
Rotary Excellence Award for Child Care – 1998
Women Achievers Award by Bangalore City Ladies Circle on International Women’s day -2002
Listed as an Indian Genius by the Week Magazine in 2008
Manthan Award for teaching math to rural children in Karnataka via satellite - 2008

Recent Projects Undertaken
Dr Nandini Mundkur was a key contributor to the PICAN - PARC Indo-Canada Autism Network in 2010

References

External links 
Center for Child Development and Disabilities

Indian paediatricians
People from Tiruvallur district
Living people
Ashoka Fellows
1949 births
Indian women medical doctors
20th-century Indian women scientists
Women scientists from Tamil Nadu
20th-century Indian medical doctors
Medical doctors from Tamil Nadu
20th-century women physicians